The 1987 Ottawa Rough Riders finished the season in 4th place in the East Division with a 3–15 record and failed to qualify for the post-season.

Offseason

CFL Draft

Preseason

Regular season

Standings

Schedule

Awards and honours

CFL Awards
None

CFL All-Stars
None

References

Ottawa Rough Riders seasons
1987 Canadian Football League season by team